CCSDS File Delivery Protocol (CFDP) is a file transfer protocol for use in space, e.g. between Earth and spacecraft in Earth orbit or between Earth and spacecraft on interplanetary missions.

The protocol is defined by CCSDS standard 727.0-B-4 and 727.0-B-5. It is also available as ISO standard 17355:2007.

References

Network file transfer protocols